Storms is an unincorporated community in Ross County, in the U.S. state of Ohio.

History
The first settlement at Storms was made in 1802. A post office called Storms was established in 1887, and remained in operation until 1940. The community was named after John Storms, the grandfather of the town merchant.

References

Unincorporated communities in Ross County, Ohio
Unincorporated communities in Ohio